Angela Hutchinson Hammer (Nov. 30, 1870 – April 9, 1952) was an American newspaperwoman. She was born in 1870, and entered the newspaper industry in the late 1890s. Hammer founded several newspapers, the most prominent being the Casa Grande Dispatch. Hammer has been inducted into both the Arizona Newspaper Hall of Fame and the Arizona Women's Hall of Fame.

Biography 
Angela Hammer was born on November 30, 1870 in Virginia City, Nevada. Her family moved to Picket Post in 1883. They moved around, as their father was a mine engineer, living in Silver King, and Wickenburg, Arizona. Six years later, she received a teaching certificate from Clara A. Evans Teachers’ Training College, and taught in Wickenburg from 1889 to 1890 and again from 1894 to 1896. From 1890 to 1893, she worked in the newspaper industry, being employed by Dunbar's Weekly, the Phoenix Gazette, and the Arizona Republican. From 1893 to 1894, she taught at Gila Bend, Arizona. In 1896, she married Joseph S. Hammer, and had three children,  William, Marvin, and Louis Joseph Fairfax. She divorced Joseph Hammer in 1904, and the following year bought her first newspaper, the Wickenburg Miner for $500. For two years (from 1908 to 1910), she worked on establishing her newspaper company, publishing the Wickenburg Miner, Swansea Times, Bouse Herald and Wenden News from a plant in Congress Junction.

In 1912, in order to better assist Ted Healey with publishing the Casa Grande Bulletin, she moved the plant from Congress Junction to Casa Grande. The two separated over a water rights issue, and on January 1, 1914, Hammer founded the Casa Grande Dispatch. In 1925, the Messenger Printing Company was founded, consisting of all Hammer's newspaper holdings. The following year, she purchased the Phoenix Messenger.  In 1922, she was Pinal County's delegate to the 1922 Democratic state convention. In 1951, the company merged with Arizona Printers Incorporated, and Hammer was put on the board of the combined company. She received an appointment to the Arizona State Board of Social Security and Welfare by Rawghlie Clement Stanford. She was inducted into The Arizona Women's Hall of Fame and the Arizona Newspaper Hall of Fame.

References

Sources
 

1870 births
1952 deaths
20th-century American newspaper publishers (people)